In basketball, points are the sum of the score accumulated through free throw or field goal. The National Collegiate Athletic Association's (NCAA) Division II scoring title is awarded to the player with the highest points per game (ppg) average in a given season.

Many of the scoring champions from the 1986–87 season and earlier could have added significantly more points if the three-point line had been instituted. It wasn't until the 1987–88 season that the NCAA standardized the line and accounted for three-point field goals in its official record book.

Scoring leaders

References

College men's basketball records and statistics in the United States